List of rivers in Pará (Brazilian State).

The list is arranged by drainage basin from north to south, with respective tributaries indented under each larger stream's name and ordered from downstream to upstream. All rivers in Pará drain to the Atlantic Ocean, the majority of the state is in the Amazon Basin.

By Drainage Basin

 Amazon River
 Cajari River
 Anajás River
 Cururu River
 Moções River
 Jacaré River
 Aramá River
 Mapuá River
 Furo do Tajapuru (connects to Pará River)
 Da Laguna River (Pauxis River)
 De Breves River (connects to Pará River)
 Baquiá Preto River
 Jari River
 Carecuru River
 Ipitinga River
 Xingu River
 Jaraucu River
 Acarai River
 Tucurui River
 Bacajá River
 Bacajaí River
 Itata River
 Iriri River
 Novo River
 Carajarí River
 Curuá River
 Baú River
 Curuaés River
 Catete River
 Xinxim River
 Chiché River
 Iriri Novo River
 Ipiranga River
 Pardo River
 Fresco River
 Branco River
 Riozinho River
 Trairão River
 Arraias River
 Petita River (Porto Alegre River)
 Ribeirão da Paz
 Liberdade River
 Paru River
 Citaré River
 Guajará River
 Jauaru River
 Maicuru River
 Curuá Una River
 Moju dos Campos River
 Curuá do Sul River
 Tutuí River
 Tapajós River
 Arapiuns River
 Aruã River
 Andirá River
 Curupara River
 Jamanxim River
 Tocantins River
 Novo River
 Crepori River
 Pacu River
 Das Tropas River
 Leste River
 Cururu River
 São Manuel River (Teles Pires River)
 Cururuaçu River
 São Benedito River
 Cristalino River
 Curuá River
 Mamiá River
 Cuminapanema River
 Trombetas River
 Paru de Oeste River (Cuminá River)
 Marapí River
 Mapuera River
 Baracuxi River
 Tauini River
 Cachorro River
 Imabu River
 Poana River
 Cafuini River
 Anamu River
 Curiaú River
 Juriti River
 Nhamundá River
 Mamuru River
 Mariaquã River
 Maués Açu River (Amazonas)
 Urupadi River
 Amanã River
 Paracauti River
 Arari River
 Atuá River
 Pracumba River
 Pará River
 Canaticú River
 Pracuúba River
 Piriá River
 Mucutá River
 Mutuacá River
 Guajará River
 Cupijó River
 Araticu River
 Dos Oeiras River
 Panaúba River
 De Breves River (connects to Amazon River)
 Furo do Tajapuru (connects to Amazon River)
 Jacundá River
 Pacajá River
 Camaraipe River
 Uriuana River
 Aratu River
 Anapu River
 Pracupí River
 Pracaí River
 Tueré River
 Tocantins River
 Paracauari River
 Saco River
 Cajàzeira River
 Da Direita River
 Itacaiunas River
 Catete River
 Sororò River
 Vermelho River
 Parauapebas River
 Tapirapé River
 Pium River
 Araguaia River
 Ribeirão Santa Maria
 Pau d'Arco River
 Arraias do Araguaia River
 Inajá River
 Campo Alegre River
 Ribeirão Santana
 Acará River
 Moju River
 Cairari River
 Acará-Mirim River
 Guamá River
 Capim River
 Camaoi River
 Surubiu River
 Ararandeua River
 Caeté River
 Piriá River
 Gurupi River
 Coraci River
 Uraim River

Alphabetically

 Acará River
 Acará-Mirim River
 Acarai River
 Amanã River
 Amazon River
 Anajás River
 Anamu River
 Anapu River
 Andirá River
 Araguaia River
 Aramá River
 Arapiuns River
 Ararandeua River
 Arari River
 Araticu River
 Aratu River
 Arraias do Araguaia River
 Arraias River
 Aruã River
 Atuá River
 Bacajá River
 Bacajaí River
 Baquiá Preto River
 Baracuxi River
 Baú River
 Branco River
 Cachorro River
 Caeté River
 Cafuini River
 Cairari River
 Cajari River
 Cajàzeira River
 Camaoi River
 Camaraipe River
 Campo Alegre River
 Capim River
 Carajarí River
 Carecuru River
 Catete River
 Catete River
 Chiché River
 Citaré River
 Coraci River
 Crepori River
 Cristalino River
 Cuminapanema River
 Cupiró River
 Curiaú River
 Curuá River
 Curuá River
 Curuá do Sul River
 Curuá Una River
 Curuaés River
 Curupara River
 Cururu River
 Cururu River
 Cururuaçu River
 Da Direita River
 Da Laguna River (Pauxis River)
 Das Tropas River
 De Breves River
 Dos Oeiras River
 Fresco River
 Furo do Tajapuru
 Guajará River
 Guajará River
 Guamá River
 Gurupi River
 Imabu River
 Inajá River
 Ipiranga River
 Ipitinga River
 Iriri River
 Iriri Novo River
 Itacaiunas River
 Itata River
 Jacaré River
 Jacundá River
 Jamanxim River
 Jaraucu River
 Jari River
 Jauaru River
 Juriti River
 Leste River
 Liberdade River
 Maicuru River
 Mamiá River
 Mamuru River
 Mapuá River
 Mapuera River
 Marapí River
 Mariaquã River
 Moções River
 Moju River
 Moju dos Campos River
 Mucutá River
 Mutuacá River
 Nhamundá River
 Novo River
 Novo River
 Pacajá River
 Pacu River
 Panaúba River
 Pará River
 Paracauari River
 Paracauti River
 Parauapebas River
 Pardo River
 Paru River
 Paru de Oeste River (Cuminá River)
 Pau d'Arco River
 Petita River (Porto Alegre River)
 Piriá River
 Piriá River
 Pium River
 Poana River
 Pracaí River
 Pracumba River
 Pracupí River
 Ribeirão da Paz
 Ribeirão Santa Maria
 Ribeirão Santana
 Riozinho River
 Saco River
 São Benedito River
 São Manuel River (Teles Pires River)
 Sororò River
 Surubiu River
 Tapajós River
 Tapirapé River
 Tauini River
 Tocantins River
 Tocantins River
 Trairão River
 Trombetas River
 Tucurui River
 Tueré River
 Tutuí River
 Uraim River
 Uriurana River
 Urupadi River
 Vermelho River
 Xingu River
 Xinxim River

References
 Map from Ministry of Transport
 Ilha de Marajó map
 Rand McNally, The New International Atlas, 1993.
  GEOnet Names Server

See also
 List of Pará rivers by confluence

 01
Para01
Rivers01